Yu Gang (born 1968) is a former Chinese political figure, and former secretary of Zhou Yongkang. Before Zhou's retirement in 2012, Yu served as the deputy director of the General Office that served the Central Politics and Law Commission, a body that Zhou headed. Yu was investigated for corruption expelled from the Chinese Communist Party in July 2014.

Life
Yu was born and raised in Nan County, Hunan, he has two brothers and one sister. In 1987, Yu was admitted to Renmin University of China, majoring in law at the School of Law. After college, Yu was assigned to the State Council of the People's Republic of China as an officer. In 2000, Yu worked as a secretary of Zhou Yongkang, who was the Minister of the Ministry of Public Security. In 2001, Yu was transferred to Heshan as the Vice-Mayor, a position he held until 2002.

On July 2, 2014, Yu was removed from office and dismissed from the Party for serious corruption.

Personal life
The Radio France Internationale reported that Yu married Tang Can, who is a Chinese military singer.

References

1968 births
Chinese Communist Party politicians from Hunan
People's Republic of China politicians from Hunan
Living people
Politicians from Yiyang